American Gurl is the second studio album by American singer and songwriter Kilo Kish. It was released on March 25, 2022, through the Kish's imprint label, Kisha Soundscape + Audio. The album comes six years after Kish's debut album, Reflections in Real Time (2016), and two years after her EP, Redux (2019).

Background
Kilo Kish released her debut studio album, Reflections in Real Time in February 2016. Kish later collaborated with several more high profile artists such as American rapper, Vince Staples in 2016, on his song "Loco", and English virtual band, Gorillaz in 2017, on their song "Out of Body". In 2018, Kish released her second EP, Mothe, and her third EP, Redux a year later in 2019.

Release and promotion
Kish announced the album's title track as the lead single on July 15, 2021. Four days later on July 19, she confirmed that an album was in the works and that she had started the project in 2019. The single was released on July 23, along with a music video. She announced the second single "Bloody Future" on August 11. The single was released on August 20, along with a music video.

The third single "New Tricks: Art, Aesthetics, and Money" was announced on January 24, 2022. It was released on January 28 and features an appearance from American rapper Vince Staples. The fourth single titled "No Apology!" was released on February 25, 2022. On March 9, Kish announced through her social media outlets that her second studio album titled American Gurl would be released on March 25, 2022, and that it had been worked on at the same time as Redux. The announcement came with the album's cover and tracklist.

Track listing

Note
 All track titles are stylized in all caps.

References

2022 albums
Kilo Kish albums
Pop albums by American artists